I'd Receive the Worst News from Your Beautiful Lips is a 2011 Brazilian romance drama film directed by Beto Brant and Renato Ciasca. Based on a novel of the same name by Marçal Aquino, it stars Camila Pitanga, Gustavo Machado, and Zecarlos Machado, in a love triangle.

Pitanga plays the role of Lavínia, a former prostitute and drug addict who is taken from the Rio de Janeiro streets by Ernani (husband), a pastor. After a period of time, the couple is shown to be living in Santarém, Pará, where Lavínia fall in love with Cauby (lover), a photographer who sees in her a muse. It took over four months to shoot it in Santarém and Rio de Janeiro.

Cast
Camila Pitanga as Lavínia
Gustavo Machado as Cauby
Zecarlos Machado as Ernani
Gero Camilo as Viktor Laurence
Antonio Pitanga as Isaías 
Adriano Barroso as Polozzi
Magnólio de Oliveira as Chico Chagas
Simone Sou as Xamã

Reception
It was first screened at the 2011 Festival do Rio on October 11, 2011, and was the most watched film over Pedro Almodóvar's The Skin I Live In. In Rio, Camila Pitanga won the Best Actress Award, and it was awarded the Best Film at the 37th Festival de Cine Iberoamericano de Huelva. Boyd van Hoeij from Variety said it is "more noteworthy for its atmosphere ... than the flashback-laden narrative, which, between vigorous sexual workouts, manages to be overly symbolical and soapy." Screendaily.coms Mark Adams declared "The film – while beautifully shot and appropriately steamy – then takes a dive into melodrama territory". Adams lauded how Brant and Ciasca "make the most of their striking lead actress and bring just the right amount of steamy sexual tension to what is in essence an old-fashioned melodrama."

References

External links

2011 romantic drama films
2011 films
Brazilian romantic drama films
Films based on Brazilian novels
Films shot in Pará
Films shot in Rio de Janeiro (city)
2010s Portuguese-language films